Fanxy Red, previously known as FFC-Acrush or simply Acrush, is a Chinese girl group. They debuted in 2017 and released their first single album, Activate, in 2019.

Artistry

Image
Fanxy Red's style is often described as androgynous or tomboyish, being mentioned in Chinese media as "meishaonian" (美少年) which means "handsome youths". In 2017, Dazed described the group as "cisgender girls, whose hair, make-up and clothes make them look uncannily like Korean boy bands – which don’t really dress like girls, but also don’t really dress like boys.”

In the past, Lu Keran stated the company doesn’t allow her to discuss her own or her teammates’ sexual orientations, and has since corrected anyone calling her a boy, instead stating that she is a girl.

Members

Current

Former

Discography

Single albums

Singles

References

External links

TOV Entertainment's official website

Chinese girl groups
K-pop music groups
Musical groups established in 2017
2017 establishments in China
Korean-language singers of China